Brigitte Naggar, better known by her stage name Common Holly, is a Canadian musician from Montreal, Quebec. As Common Holly, Naggar has released two full-length albums.

History
Naggar's first album, Playing House, was released in 2017. The album was originally self-released on Bandcamp, before later being widely released by Solitaire Recordings. Naggar followed up that release two years later. On July 24, 2019, Naggar announced plans to release her second full-length album as Common Holly. Speaking about the album, Naggar stated, 

The album, titled When I say to you Black Lightning, was released on October 27, 2019 through Barsuk Records.

Discography
Studio albums
Playing House (2017, Solitaire Recordings)
When I say to you Black Lightning (Barsuk Records, 2019)

References

Living people
Barsuk Records artists
Musicians from Montreal
21st-century Canadian women singers
Year of birth missing (living people)